The Vale of Glamorgan Association Football League is a football league covering the area of the Vale of Glamorgan in Glamorgan, South Wales and the surrounding areas. The leagues are at the seventh and eighth levels of the Welsh football league system.

History
The league has its origins in the Barry and District League first formed in 1907.

Divisions
The league is composed of two divisions, which are in Tiers 7 and 8 of the Welsh Football League System.

Member clubs for 2022–23 season
The following clubs are competing in the Vale of Glamorgan League during the 2022–23 season.

Premier Division 

AFC Rhoose
Barry Athletio
Cardiff Airport reserves
Cogan Coronation reserves
Cwm Talwg
Holton Road
Island Marine
Penarth Town
St Athan
Sully Sports reserves
Vale United reserves

Championship 

Barry Athletic reserves
Barry Vikings
Cardiff Airport Vets
Holton Road reserves
Island Marine reserves
Peterston Super Ely
Rhoose Social
St Athan ‘B’
St Athan ‘C’
Tynewydd
Vale Athletic
Vale Madrid

Promotion and relegation
Promotion from the Premier Division is possible to the South Wales Alliance League, with the champion of the league playing the other tier 7 champions from the South Wales regional leagues via play-off games to determine promotion.

Champions (Premier Division)

1998–99:
1999-2000:
2000–01: –
2001–02: –
2002–03: –
2003–04: –
2004–05: –
2006–06: –
2006–07: – Rhoose
2007–08: – Penarth Town
2008–09: – SW Flooring
2009–10: – SW Dockers
2010–11: – Dockers
2011–12: –
2012–13: – AFC Colcot   
2013–14: – Barry Athletic
2014–15: – Cardiff Airport (100% win record)
2015–16: – Cardiff Airport
2016–17: – Vale United
2017–18: – Barry Athletic
2018–19: – Barry Athletic
2019–20: – Island Marine
2020–21: – Competition cancelled due to Covid-19 pandemic
2021–22: – Penarth Town

References

External links
 Vale of Glamorgan Association Football League

8
Sports leagues established in 1998
1998 establishments in Wales
Sport in the Vale of Glamorgan